Beaufortia may refer to:
 Beaufortia (fish), a genus of hillstream loach
 Beaufortia (plant), a genus of plants in the family Myrtaceae
 Beaufortia, the bulletin of the Zoological Museum Amsterdam, published by the University of Amsterdam

Genus disambiguation pages